DS6, DS-6, or DS 6 may refer to:

 DS 6, a Chinese subcompact SUV
 Nerf Elite ShellStrike DS-6, a Nerf Blaster
 DeepStar Six, 1989 American science fiction horror film